Ignacio Horacio Ortiz (born 26 July 1987) is an Argentine field hockey player who plays as a midfielder for Banco Provincia. He competed in the field hockey competition at the 2016 Summer Olympics, where he won the gold medal. He played club hockey for Real Club de Polo de Barcelona in Spain.

In July 2019, he was selected in the Argentina squad for the 2019 Pan American Games. They won the gold medal by defeating Canada 5–2 in the final.

References

External links

Living people
1987 births
Argentine male field hockey players
Olympic field hockey players of Argentina
Male field hockey midfielders
Field hockey players at the 2016 Summer Olympics
2018 Men's Hockey World Cup players
Field hockey players at the 2019 Pan American Games
Olympic gold medalists for Argentina
Medalists at the 2016 Summer Olympics
Olympic medalists in field hockey
South American Games gold medalists for Argentina
South American Games medalists in field hockey
Real Club de Polo de Barcelona players
División de Honor de Hockey Hierba players
Competitors at the 2014 South American Games
Field hockey players from Buenos Aires
Expatriate field hockey players
Argentine expatriate sportspeople in Spain
Pan American Games medalists in field hockey
Pan American Games gold medalists for Argentina
Medalists at the 2019 Pan American Games
Field hockey players at the 2020 Summer Olympics
21st-century Argentine people